The following is a list of Supreme Court of Canada opinions written by Malcolm Rowe during his tenure on the Court.

2017
{| width=100%
|-
|
{| width=100% align=center cellpadding=0 cellspacing=0
|-
! bgcolor=#CCCCCC | Malcolm Rowe 2017 statistics
|-
|

Supreme Court of Canada reasons by judge